Phacellocera is a monotypic beetle genus in the family Cerambycidae described by Laporte in 1840. Its only species, Phacellocera plumicornis, was described by Johann Christoph Friedrich Klug in 1825.

References

Anisocerini
Beetles described in 1825
Monotypic beetle genera